The 2008 Australian Football International Cup was the third time the Australian Football International Cup, an international Australian rules football competition, has been contested.

It was scheduled for 2008 (as part of the 150th year celebrations of Australian Football), with 16 nations competing.

The tournament was hosted by both Melbourne and Warrnambool in Victoria, Australia between 27 August and 6 September, with a single match additionally played in Geelong.

Like previous tournaments, the competition was open to men's teams with strict nationality eligibility rules.

The Grand Final was played between New Zealand and Papua New Guinea. Papua New Guinea were victorious by 8 points with a goal kicked after the siren.  Like the Grand Final in previous years, the match was played at the Melbourne Cricket Ground as a curtain raiser to the 2008 AFL Second qualifying Final which attracted a crowd of 76,703 spectators. However unlike previous tournaments, the final was not televised.

History and build up
The WAFL and Perth, Western Australia raised the possibility of bidding for the tournament soon after the 2005 cup had been completed, however the AFL has confirmed that the cup will once again be held in Melbourne for at least for one more year, as the 2008 Cup will coincide with Australian Rules football's 150th anniversary.  The AFL later indicated that a regional round and semi-finals would be held in Warrnambool.

The AFL indicated that unlike earlier cups, it would likely be split into two divisions, a premier division and development division, with some discussion as to whether the eligibility rules could be loosened for the development division, to enable more countries to participate.  Leagues were given the opportunity to nominate which they would prefer, with eight in each division being an initial target. Ultimately, this idea was dropped, with the sixteen teams being seeded into four pools.

In December 2007, it was announced that Melbourne and Warrnambool would co-host the two division event, with Melbourne matches to be played mainly in Royal Park North.  Several potential new sides were announced by the AFL, including an Israeli-Palestine combination supported by the Peres Centre for Peace, China and India.

The USA Women's team announced an intention to send a squad to play against Australia and possibly Papua New Guinea. Additionally Canada and England announced their intentions to send Under 17s squads. As a result, there was speculation over an inaugural women's and under 17 divisions.  However the AFL denied these divisions in favour of a senior men's competition only.  In response, and with the Barassi International Australian Football Youth Tournament being cancelled, British and Canadian junior teams had to organise their own tours and matches against Australian schools.  Despite both international teams being in Australia at the same time, they did not play against each other. The US women's team announced a 2009 tour instead.

Competing Nations
The AFL confirmed in July 2008 that sixteen nations will compete. In addition, there will be friendly matches played between Melbourne-based migrant community teams under the names "Team Africa" and "Team Asia", as well as the Tongan side which was unable to commit to the full tournament. Also despite a previous appearance, the Spain Bulls will not be competing.

Games

Round 1

Round 2

Round 3

Group Results After Rounds

Pool A

Pool B

Pool C

Pool D

Finals

Finals Round 1

Finals Round 2

Knockout-Chart (Final 4)

Individual awards

World Team
The world team was selected based on player performance in the pool rounds only.
India, China, the Peace Team and Finland all missed representation in the team.

Tournament Best & Fairest winners

Gallery

See also
Countries playing Australian rules football
Geography of Australian rules football
AFL Women's National Championship

References

External links
Official 2008 International Cup Homepage
 http://www.aussierulesinternational.com
Long term view to IC2008 – part one article from World Footy News with predictions on 2008 results
Long term view to IC2008 – part two article from World Footy News with predictions on 2008 results
World Footy News International Cup homepage
Video of Aussie Rules from YouTube

Australian Football International Cup
Australian Football International Cup, 2008